The office of High Sheriff of Gwynedd was established in 1974 as part of the creation of the county of Gwynedd in Wales following the Local Government Act 1972, and effectively replaced the shrievalties of the amalgamated counties of Anglesey, Caernarfonshire and Merionethshire.

High Sheriffs of Gwynedd 
1974–1975: Captain Somerville Travers Alexander Livingstone-Learmonth of Tan-yr-Allt, Tremadog, Porthmadog.
1975–1976: Robert Sydney Lloyd of Llys Wen Bach, Paradwyhs, Bodorgan.
1976–1977: Alfred Cedric Maby of Cae Canol, Minffordd, Penrhyndeudraeth.
1977–1978: Robert Gwilym Pritchard-Jones of Coed Hywel, Clynnog Road, Caernarvon.
1978–1979: Thomas Stanley Carpenter of Carreglwyd, Llanfaethlu.
1979–1980: Cdr Hamilton Ridler of Wern-y-Wylan, near Beaumaris.
1980–1981: Gwilym Prys Davies of Castellmai, Caeathro, Caernarfon.
1981–1982: Squadron Leader Jack Grenville Kerby of Westbury Mount, Holyhead.
1982–1983: Richard Ellis Meuric Rees of Escuan Hall, Tywyn.
1983–1984: Ivor Wyn Jones, of Geirian, Pengelli Wyn, Caernarfon.
1984–1985: Wing Commander Robert Woodward Turner of Angorfa, Red Wharf Bay, Anglesey.
1985–1986: Dr David Eryl Meredith of Ty'nycae, Dolgellau
1986–1987: Peter Arnold Sturrock of Bryn Farm, Caernarfon.
1987–1988: Owen Gwilym Thomas of Chwaen Goch, Llanerchymedd, Anglesey.
1988–1989: Owen Morris Jonathan of Isallt, Porthmadog Road, Criccieth.
1989–1990: Hywel Francis Richards of Glanllynnau, Chwilog, Pwllheli.
1990–1991: Mrs. Tessa Gillian Rosamond Preece, of Plas Llanddyfnan, Talwrn, Anglesey.
1991–1992: Robert Gwilym Lewis-Jones of ManSiriol, Cae Deintur, Dolgellau.
1992–1993: Mrs Annwen Carey-Evans of Eisteddfa, Pentre Felin, Criccieth.
1993–1994: Sir Richard Thomas Williams-Bulkeley, 14th Baronet
1994–1995: Robert Hefin Davies of Bryn Awel, Blaenau Ffestiniog.
1995–1996: William Wyn Roberts
1996–1997: Major D. O. Carpenter of Rhosneigr, Anglesey 
1997–1998: Mrs Ella Wynne Jones of Llandecwyn, Talsarnau.
1998–1999: Professor Eric Sunderland of Ffriddoedd Road, Bangor
1999–2000: William David Innes Edwards, Gwredog, Rhosgoch, Amlwch, Anglesey 
2000–2001: Gerallt Wyn Hughes of Ty’n y Coed, Arthog.
2001–2002: Mrs Bettina Harden of Nanhoron, Pwllheli.
2002–2003: Mrs Patricia Hughes of Plas Llanfaes, near Beaumaris, Anglesey.
2003–2004: Robin John Price of “Rhiwlas” Bala.
2004–2005: Jonathan Clough Williams-Ellis
2005–2006: Mrs Jessamy Rosamund Melhuish Alexander 
2006–2007: Richard Andrew Meredyth Richards
2007–2008: Dr Dewi Wyn Roberts
2008–2009: Peter Rogers
2009–2010: Trevor Norman Corbett 
2010–2011: Griffith Richard Eifion Evans 
2011–2012: Professor Robin Grove-White
2012–2013: Edmund S. Bailey of Llanbedr
2013–2014: Marian Wyn Jones of Caernarvon
2014–2015: David Murray Lea-Wilson of Maes Y Borth, Dwyran, Llanfairpwll, Isle of Anglesey 
2015–2016: Dr Elizabeth Mary Nesbit Andrews MBE of Aberdyfi
2016–2017: Dr P G Harlech Jones
2017–2018: Professor Sian Hope
2018–2019: Mrs Kathryn Kerena Griffiths Ellis of Y Ffor, Pwllheli
2019–2020: Mrs Susan Moules Jones, Gaerwen, Isle of Anglesey  
2020–2021: David Eryl Francis Williams of Harlech 
2021-2022: Gwyn Peredur Owen 
2022-2023: Mrs Davina Carey-Evans
2023-2024: Mrs Janet Phillips

See also
 High Sheriff of Anglesey
 High Sheriff of Caernarvonshire
 High Sheriff of Merionethshire

References

Whitaker's Almanack, various editions

 
Gwynedd
Gwynedd